Fredrik Lundgren (born 26 October 1979) is a retired Swedish footballer who played as a defender and midfielder. His last club was GAIS.

References

External links
 
  
  

1979 births
Living people
GAIS players
Swedish footballers
Torslanda IK players
Allsvenskan players
Association football midfielders